Nathan Lowell is a science fiction writer mostly known for his The Golden Age of the Solar Clipper series.

Dr. Nathan Lowell holds a Ph.D. in Educational Technology with specializations in Distance Education and Instructional Design. He also holds an M.A. in Educational Technology and a BS in Business Administration. He grew up on the south coast of Maine and is strongly rooted in the maritime heritage of the sea-farer. He served in the USCG from 1970 to 1975, seeing duty aboard a cutter on hurricane patrol in the North Atlantic and at a communications station in Kodiak, Alaska. He currently lives in the plains east of the Rocky Mountains with his wife and two daughters.

In an interview with Lindsay Buroker, he explains that he started his publishing as a self-published author at podiobooks in 2007, but later signed with Ridan Publishing.

Lowell has won the PARSEC Awards two times, in 2010 for the Captain's Share and 2011 for Owner's Share.

Bibliography

Trader's Tales From the Golden Age Of The Solar Clipper 
Quarter Share 
 Half Share 
 Full Share 
 Double Share 
 Captain's Share 
 Owner's Share

Tanyth Fairport Adventures 
 Ravenwood
 Zypheria's Call
 The Hermit of Lammas Wood

Tales From The Deep Dark 
 A Light In The Dark

Tales From The Archives Short Stories 
 The Astonishing Amulet of Amenartas

Shaman’s Tales From the Golden Age Of The Solar Clipper 
 South Coast
 Cape Grace
 Finwell Bay

Seeker’s Tales From The Golden Age Of The Solar Clipper 
 In Ashes Born
 To Fire Called
 By Darkness Forged

Smuggler's Tales from the Golden Age of the Solar Clipper 
 Milk Run
 Suicide Run
 Home Run

The Wizard's Butler 
 The Wizard's Butler

References

External links
 
 

Living people
American science fiction writers
University at Buffalo alumni
1952 births